Pethia didi is a species of cyprinid fish which has only been recorded in the vicinity of Myitkyina and Indawgyi Lake in the north of Myanmar.

This is a small fish which can reach a length of  SL. It is generally brownish with a dark vertical bar just behind the operculum and a round dark blotch on the caudal peduncle. The species P. tiantian – with a range close to P. didi – is similarly marked, but P. didi can be distinguished by its truncated lateral line, deeper body and longer dorsal fin, with two rows of dark markings rather than one.

References 

Pethia
Fish described in 2005
Barbs (fish)